The 2018 Danish Cup final was played on 10 May 2018 between Brøndby IF and Silkeborg IF at Parken Stadium, Copenhagen, a neutral ground. The final was the culmination of the 2017–18 Danish Cup, the 64th season of the Danish Cup.

Brøndby IF won their seventh Danish Cup title after defeating Silkeborg IF 3–1, earning themselves a place in the second qualifying round of the 2018–19 UEFA Europa League.

Teams

Venue
All Cup Finals except the 1991 final (Odense Stadium) and 1992 final (Aarhus Idrætspark) have been played in the Copenhagen Sports Park (1955-1990), or Parken Stadium (1993-present)

Background
The Superliga clubs Brøndby IF and Silkeborg IF contested the final, with the winner earning a place in the second qualifying round of the 2018–19 UEFA Europa League.  

Brøndby competed in its second consecutive final after losing to F.C. Copenhagen in 2017 and their eighth in total. Silkeborg IF made its first finals appearance since 2001 and their second overall. Both clubs lost in their previous final appearances. The two teams had never previously met in a Danish Cup final, and Brøndby has won both meetings during the regular season of the 2017-18 Danish Superliga.

Route to the final

Note: In all results below, the score of the finalist is given first (H: home; A: away).

Match

Details

References

Danish Cup Final
Danish Cup Final 2018
Silkeborg IF
Danish Cup Finals
Danish Cup Final
Sports competitions in Copenhagen